Christian Sesma is an American filmmaker.  He has directed such films as Vigilante Diaries (2016), Paydirt (2020), Take Back (2021) and Every Last One of Them (2021).

Sesma was born and raised in the Coachella Valley.  He grew up in Palm Springs, California.  He divides his time between Cathedral City, California and West Hollywood, California.

Filmography

References

External links
 

Living people
21st-century American screenwriters
People from Palm Springs, California
Film producers from California
American film producers
American male screenwriters
American film directors
American film editors
Screenwriters from California
Year of birth missing (living people)